This is a complete list of the railway stations served by Rodalies de Catalunya services.

Stations

Rodalies de Catalunya